Konstantinos G. Simitis (born 23 June 1936), usually referred to as Costas Simitis or Kostas Simitis (Κώστας Σημίτης), is a Greek politician who served as Prime Minister of Greece and was leader of the Panhellenic Socialist Movement (PASOK) from 1996 to 2004.

Biography 
Costas Simitis was born in Piraeus to Georgios Simitis, a Professor at the School of Economic and Commercial Sciences, and to his wife Fani (née Christopoulou). He studied law at the University of Marburg in Germany and economics at the London School of Economics. He is married to Daphne Arkadiou (b. 1938), and has two daughters, Fiona and Marilena.  He currently resides in the Kolonaki district of Athens.  His brother Spiros Simitis is a prominent jurist specializing on data privacy in Germany.

Political activity before 1981 
In 1965 he returned to Greece and was one of the founders of the "Alexandros Papanastasiou" political research group. In 1967, after the military coup of 21 April, this group was transformed into Democratic Defense, an organization opposed to the military regime. Simitis escaped abroad after planting bombs in the streets of Athens (in later years he acknowledged his activities on Greek MEGA TV channel) in order to avoid being jailed and became a member of the Panhellenic Liberation Movement (PAK), led by Andreas Papandreou. He also took up a position as university lecturer in Germany. He returned to Athens in 1974 and was one of the co-founders of PAK's successor, the Panhellenic Socialist Movement (PASOK). In 1977 he took up a lecturer's post at the Panteion University.

Ministerial offices 
Simitis was not a candidate for the Greek Parliament in the 1981 elections, but he was appointed Minister of Agriculture in the first PASOK government of that year. Following the 1985 elections and his election as a deputy to the Parliament, he became Minister of National Economy; he undertook an unpopular stabilization program, trying to curb inflation and reduce deficits, but resigned his post in 1987 because he felt that his policies were being undermined. In 1993 he took over the Ministry of Commerce and Industry, but in 1995 he again resigned from the ministry and the party's Executive Bureau following a public rebuke he received by Prime Minister Papandreou.

Rise to the offices of Prime Minister and President of PASOK 
On 16 January 1996 Papandreou resigned as Prime Minister due to ill health. In a special election held by the party's parliamentary group on 18 January, Simitis was elected in his place, over the candidacies of Akis Tsochatzopoulos, Gerasimos Arsenis and Ioannis Charalampopoulos. Papandreou however remained Chairman of the party for the next months until his death on 23 June (also Simitis' 60th birthday), just before a party conference would select the party's vice-president; after Papandreou's death, the conference would elect the new Party President. Simitis was elected in PASOK's Fourth Congress on 30 June, defeating Akis Tsochatzopoulos on a platform of support for the European Union.

Simitis then led the party in the national elections of 22 September 1996, gaining a mandate in his own right. He also narrowly won the national election of 2000. He worked very closely and had a good relationship with his Cabinet Secretary of 8 years, Sokratis Kosmidis. Although he is widely respected throughout Europe, in Greece Simitis was regarded by some Greeks as a rather dull technocrat, lacking the charisma of Papandreou.

On 7 January 2004, with PASOK's popularity collapsing, Simitis announced that he would resign as party president and would not stand for re-election as Prime Minister in the forthcoming legislative elections. At the time he was accused of bowing out to avoid humiliation at the polls. However, by the end of his tenure on 10 March, he would be in office for over 8 consecutive years, the longest continuous term in modern Greek history. In a past interview Simitis had already stated that he would remain prime minister for only 2 legislative periods, since "he wanted to do other things in his life as well". On 8 January he called elections for the position of party president to be held on 8 February. Simitis was succeeded as PASOK leader by then-Minister of Foreign Affairs George Papandreou, the only candidate in these elections. Despite Papandreou's personal popularity, PASOK lost the 7 March elections to the conservative New Democracy party, whose leader Kostas Karamanlis succeeded Simitis in the office of Prime Minister.

Political activity after 2004 
After the 2004 electoral defeat, Simitis remained a Member of the Hellenic Parliament for Piraeus, sitting on the Standing Committee on National Defence and Foreign Affairs. Re-elected in September 2007, he entered in a conflict with his successor as PASOK leader George Papandreou on the political choices of the party. In June 2008, he was excluded from the PASOK parliamentary group after opposing Papandreou's position in favour of a referendum on the Treaty of Lisbon, which he had helped to draft as member of the Amato Group. Though never formally excluded from the party, he kept his distance with the leadership and could not come to terms with Papandreou in time to be candidate for the 2009 elections, upon which he definitively left his MP seat for Piraeus.

Policies and legacy

Social policies 

Various social reforms were carried out under Simitis. EKAS, an income-tested pension supplement that restored the link of minimum pension with 20 daily minimum wages, was introduced, while the pension replacement rate was set as 70% of the last 5 years of salaries. Seniority pensions were also introduced, along with a contributory pension scheme for farmers. 
Law 2738/1999 on "collective bargaining in the public administration, permanent status for workers employed under open-ended contracts and other provisions" laid down, for the first time, “the right of public servants to negotiate their terms and conditions of employment, excluding pay and pensions, and to conclude collective agreements.” Law 2874/2000 on 'Employment regulations and other provisions,' in addition to working time arrangements, “ regulates a range of important issues relating to labour relations, such as overtime, redundancies and matters involving leave,” while Law 2839/2000 on 'Regulation of matters regarding the Ministry of Foreign Affairs, Public Administration and Decentralisation and other provisions' established a gender quota system in the public sector's various governing councils, administrative boards and collective bodies. In 2003, a substantial level of legislative activity relating to employment, workplace health and safety and social security took place.

Financial policies 
Simitis is largely known in Greece for his political philosophy which is known as "Eksynchronismos" (modernization) which focused on extensive public investment and infrastructure works as well as economic and labor reforms. Simitis is credited by his supporters with overcoming chronic problems of the Greek economy and thus achieving the admittance of Greece into the Eurozone. During the period of his governance, official data presented inflation as having decreased from 15% to 3%, public deficits diminished from 14% to 3%, GDP increasing at an annual average of 4% and factual labor incomes having increased at a rate of 3% per year. However, the macroeconomic data presented by Simitis' government were called into question by an audit performed by the successor government of New Democracy in 2004.

Many large-scale infrastructure projects were carried out or begun during the so-called 'era of Eksychronismos', such as the new "Eleftherios Venizelos" Athens International Airport, the Rio-Antirio bridge, the Athens Metro and the Egnatia Odos.

Internal issues 

In 2000, Simitis was embroiled in a dispute with the Archbishop of the influential Greek Orthodox Church, Christodoulos of Athens, when the Greek government sought to remove the "Religion" field from the national ID cards carried by Greek citizens on the grounds that the Hellenic Data Protection Authority recommended so; its decision also included the "Nationality" field, but was not implemented following a subsequent EE directive to the contrary. Christodoulos opposed the decision, claiming that the action pursued deviously the religious de-identification of the Greek nation. Faced by the government's robust but unpopular stance, he organised two massive demonstrations in Athens and Thessaloniki, alongside a majority of bishops of the Church of Greece. The attitude of Simitis gained faint-hearted support even within his party, but found a surprisingly militant ally in the Eksychronismos opinion makers. Kostas Karamanlis, the opposition leader, signed a petition, organized by the Church of Greece, calling for a referendum on the matter and signed, too, by more than three million citizens. However, the inclusion of religious beliefs on ID cards, even on a voluntary basis, as the Church had asked, was deemed unconstitutional by the Greek courts.

Foreign policy 

While PASOK traditionalists disliked his move away from the more traditional/orthodox norms of the Democratic socialism of Andreas Papandreou' policies, and also his relative moderation on issues such as the Cyprus dispute and the Macedonia naming dispute, his supporters saw both of these as positive elements of the eksynchronismos movement that Simitis was seen as spearheading.

During January–June 2003, Simitis, as Greek Prime Minister, exercised the presidency of the European Council.

Controversy and criticism
In 1996, the appointment of the PASOK-leaning To Vima newspaper editor, Stavros Psycharis, as political administrator of Mount Athos was particularly criticised by the opposition.

Siemens bribery scandal

A major issue during Simitis' tenure concerned corruption, which become endemic in Greek public life (including the Siemens Greek bribery scandal, incidents like Akis Tsochatzopoulos, who later was imprisoned for criminal actions for the purchase of the German type 214 submarines) etc.

Siemens CEO, Michalis Christoforakos, during his trial in Germany testified to has bribed (2%) both the two major political parties, ND and PASOK (through Geitonas and Tsoukatos, partner of Kostas Simitis). The money according to Tsoukatos were put in the cash desk of PASOK. As of 2018, Simitis was under prosecutor investigation regarding the Siemens Greek bribery scandal, but was later exonerated.

Validity of statistical data
New Democracy revised the size of the defense expenditures for the years 1997-2003, by changing the regulation for the cost accounting of the defense expenditures, from the date of delivery of war material (delivery basis), which was at the time followed by half the countries of the EU, to the payment date of the advance payments (cash basis). Eurostat accepted the change, because of the lack of reliable data for the deliveries of war material. By the revision of the defense expenditures of 1999 the deficit of 1999, the year of the Greek economy’s evaluation, amounted to 3.1%. Since 2005, Eurostat changed its rules records the defense expenditures according to the delivery date for all the countries of the EU including Greece. Eurostat requested then the member countries to correct their data retroactively. Greece did not proceed to the rectification.

The deficit of 1999, year of the Greek economy’s evaluation, is still presented to be 3.1% of the Gross National product (GNP), greater than the Maastricht criterion for a deficit lower than 3% of the GNP. Subsequent revisions of the data show also other countries exceeding the fiscal deficit (government deficit) of 3% during the evaluation period. Thus, in 1997, which is the year of the evaluation of the first countries that became members of the Euro zone, the deficit of France was 3.3%, of Spain 3.4% and of Portugal 3.4%.

Other
Other points of criticism included the financial crash of 1999 in the Athens Exchange, such as his handling on the Abdullah Öcalan's capture and the Imia incident regarding the foreign relations with Turkey.

Simitis rejected New Democracy's bills for accountability and transparency with regards to governmental expenditure and decisions, while New Democracy leader Kostas Karamanlis accused Simitis during a parliamentary plenum of being an "archpriest of cronyism", referencing the index of the NGO Transparency International. However, Greece's position has fallen by 5 places in the same index during the New Democracy government (2004-2009). Four years later Karamanlis himself admitted that he exaggerated and that he never doubted Simitis' personal integrity.

Works 

Simitis has authored several books and articles on legal and economic issues as well as on politics.

Political works 
 "Structural Opposition", Athens 1979
 "Politics, Government and Law", Athens 1981
 "Politics of Financial stabilization", N. Garganas, T. Thomopoulos, Costas Simitis, G. Spraos, introduction-preface: Costas Simitis, Athens 1989, Gnosi Publications
 "Populism and Politics", N. Mouzelis, T. Lipovach, M. Spourdalakis, introduction Costas Simitis, Athens 1989, Gnosi Publications
 "Development and modernisation of the Greek Society", Athens 1989, Gnosi Publications
 "Views on the politic strategy of PASOK", Athens, 1990
 "Propositions for another politics", Athens 1992, Gnosi Publications
 "Nationalist Populism or national strategy;", Athens 1992, Gnosi Publications
 "Let's dare united", Athens 1994
 "For a strong society and a strong Greece", Athens 1995, Plethron Publications
 "For a financially strong and socially fair Greece", Athens 2002, Kastanioti Publications
 "For a strong in Europe and in the world Greece", Athens 2002, Kastanioti Publications
 "For a strong, modern and democratic Greece", Athens 2002, Kastanioti Publications
 "Politics for a Creative Greece 1996–2004" ("Πολιτική για μια Δημιουργική Ελλάδα 1996–2004" in Greek), Athens 2005, Polis Publications
 "Objectives, Strategy and Perspectives", Athens 2007, Polis Publications
 "Democracy in Crisis?", Athens 2007, Polis Publications

See also 
 Politics of Greece
 List of prime ministers of Greece

References

External links 

 His profile in Who is Who at Nato
 Simitis' article on Greece's deficit revision in 2004 by the new government as posted in Financial Times
  Website of Costas Simitis

|-

|-

|-

|-

|-

|-

|-

1936 births
20th-century prime ministers of Greece
21st-century prime ministers of Greece
Alumni of the London School of Economics
Economy ministers of Greece
20th-century Greek economists
Greek MPs 1996–2000
Greek MPs 2000–2004
Greek MPs 2004–2007
Greek MPs 2007–2009
Leaders of PASOK
Living people
Ministers of National Education and Religious Affairs of Greece
Agriculture ministers of Greece
Academic staff of Panteion University
Politicians from Piraeus
Prime Ministers of Greece
Academic staff of the University of Giessen
Academic staff of the University of Konstanz
University of Marburg alumni
Academic staff of the University of Marburg
Recipients of the Order of the White Star, 1st Class
Members of the Panhellenic Liberation Movement